Operation Shurta Nasir or Operation Police Victory or the Battle of Hīt was an operation led by U.S. troops and Iraqi SWAT teams trying to capture the town of Hīt from Al-Qaeda forces. The goal of the mission was to eject the Al-Qaeda from the city and establish three police stations there to cement authority in the town. The Al-Qaeda retreating would be caught in the net of encircling U.S. troops which numbered 1,000 men. The operation was a success, and Hīt was captured and freed from the terrorists.

The trouble with Hīt 

Hīt was home to 80,000 people at the time of the Iraq War. When Al-Qaeda captured the town, they implanted IEDs in the highways leading into Hīt. U.S. troops tried unsuccessfully to capture Hīt; Al-Qaeda was able to defend the town. Sheikh Hikat, former leader of Hīt, was frustrated by the lack of progress in recapturing the town. He met with Sergeant Martin Moore of the 5th Special Forces Group and Moore came up with an idea called Operation Shurta Nasir, or "Operation Police Victory." The operation was named for the Iraqi SWAT teams that would help U.S. troops re-take the town.

Operation Shurta Nasir 

When the operation proceeded, 1,000 U.S. troops encircled Hīt, waiting for the task force of 26 men to make Al-Qaeda to run into the U.S. net lurking outside the town. Mohammed Sent, a wanted Al-Qaeda leader, was in the town with his entourage of Al-Qaeda troops. The task force moved into the town, and dismantled locked gates with explosives. Sammy, the Arabic translator for Sergeant Moore, told the citizens to hide and take cover.

U.S. troops moved into a house, and saw two Al-Qaeda soldiers masquerading as college students. They were arrested, but would only be fully incarcerated when a police station was built. 25 Iraqi policemen and 11 U.S. Marines were sent to reinforce the task force. The U.S. troops moved out, and engaged Al-Qaeda in street fighting. Mohammed Sent escaped the fighting and took flight. The town was secured, and the retreating Al-Qaeda, save for Sent, were killed or captured by the net.

Aftermath 

With Hīt secure, three police stations were built. The IEDs were disarmed, and Hīt was secure. However, there was more fighting to come in later years, and the city shifted to Iraqi Government control. The town of Hīt was safe, but Sent was not captured yet. He was still wanted. Later, General David Petraeus, the top American commander in Iraq, walked the streets of Hīt without wearing a helmet or body armor while eating ice cream, and wasn't imperiled at all. This proved Hīt's security and safety.

References 

Shurta Nasir
Shurta Nasir
2007 in Iraq
February 2007 events in Iraq